Lakkaraju Garlapadu is a village in Palnadu district of the Indian state of Andhra Pradesh. It is located in Sattenapalle mandal of Guntur revenue division.

Geography 
Lakkaraju Garlapadu is located at coordinates:16°52'78"N   79°74'98"E geographically.

Demography 

Telugu is the local language. The village of Lakkaraju Garlapadu covers an area of about 1682 hectares. As of 2011 India census, Lakkaraju Garlapadu had a population of 4203, with 2075 men and 2128 women living in 947 houses. Ramalayam and Poleramma temple famous in that village

Governance 

Lakkaraju Garlapadu gram panchayat is the local self-government of the village. It is divided into wards and each ward is represented by a ward member. The elected members of the gram panchayat is headed by a sarpanch. The village forms a part of Andhra Pradesh Capital Region and is under the jurisdiction of APCRDA.

References 

Villages in Palnadu district